Richard Bentley is a Guamanian Olympic hurdler. He represented his country in the men's 400 metres hurdles at the 1992 Summer Olympics. His time was a 57.04 in the hurdles.

References

External links
 

1960 births
Living people
Male hurdlers
Olympic track and field athletes of Guam
Athletes (track and field) at the 1992 Summer Olympics
Guamanian male track and field athletes